Horace "Bru" McCoy III (born June 22, 2000) is an American college football wide receiver who attends the University of Tennessee and plays for the Tennessee Volunteers football team. He previously attended the University of Southern California (USC), where he played for the USC Trojans.

Early life
Horace McCoy III received the nickname "Bruiser", from his grandmother when he was eight months old; the nickname was later shortened to "Bru". His parents were athletes at Northern Illinois University; his father, Horace II, played college football, and his mother, Shelby, played volleyball. He has two sisters, Alexa and Ava.

Career
Though the McCoy family lives in Rancho Palos Verdes, California, he went to Mater Dei High School in Santa Ana, California, instead of Palos Verdes High School, because he thought it would improve his chances of playing college football. He played for Mater Dei's football team as a wide receiver and linebacker. In his senior year, he had 77 receptions for 1,428 yards and 18 touchdowns as a receiver, and five sacks as a linebacker. MaxPreps named him their National Football Player of the Year. He was named to the All-American Bowl, and won the U.S. Army Player of the Year Award.

A five star recruit out of high school, 247Sports.com ranked him the ninth-best recruit in the class of 2019. McCoy committed to the University of Southern California (USC) to play for the USC Trojans. He graduated early from Mater Dei and enrolled at USC in January 2019. After 17 days, he opted to transfer to the University of Texas at Austin, as he felt betrayed by Kliff Kingsbury, the Trojans' offensive coordinator, leaving USC to be the head coach for the Arizona Cardinals of the National Football League. He participated in spring practice with the Texas Longhorns, before he decided to leave Texas. He transferred back to USC in June. He missed several months of the 2019 season due to symptoms that were never diagnosed, and took a redshirt for the season. McCoy made his college football debut for the Trojans in the 2020 season. He caught 21 passes for 236 yards and two touchdowns.
After a July 2021 arrest for alleged domestic violence, McCoy was suspended indefinitely from the football team. Citing privacy regulations, former USC coach Clay Helton was not forthcoming with more information with the media. Despite all charges being dropped for a lack of evidence, USC did not reinstate McCoy.

In May 2022, McCoy announced his transfer to the University of Tennessee to play for the Tennessee Volunteers football team. On the 2022 season, McCoy recorded 52 receptions for 667 receiving yards and four receiving touchdowns. He had three games going over the 100-yard mark in the Volunteers 11–2 season.

References

External links
Tennessee Volunteers bio
USC Trojans bio

Living people
People from Rancho Palos Verdes, California
American football wide receivers
USC Trojans football players
Sportspeople from Los Angeles County, California
Players of American football from California
2000 births
Tennessee Volunteers football players